Alan Shane Lewis is a Canadian comedian, actor and television host, best known as the co-host with Ann Pornel of The Great Canadian Baking Show since season 4.

An alumnus of The Second City's Toronto company who appeared most notably in the 2019 revue If I Could #Throwback Time, he is a partner with Coko Galore, PHATT Al, Brandon Ash-Mohammed, Nkasi Ogbonnah, Ajahnis Charley, Aba Amuquandoh and Brandon Hackett in Untitled Black Sketch Project, Canada's first all-Black Canadian sketch comedy troupe.

He has also had acting roles in the television series Christian & Nat and the short film Duppy, and competed in episodes of Roast Battle Canada

Lewis and Pornel received a Canadian Screen Award nomination for Best Host or Presenter in a Factual or Reality/Competition Series at the 10th Canadian Screen Awards in 2022 for The Great Canadian Baking Show.

References

External links

Living people
21st-century Canadian comedians
21st-century Canadian male actors
Canadian sketch comedians
Canadian male comedians
Canadian male television actors
Canadian male film actors
Black Canadian comedians
Canadian television hosts
Black Canadian broadcasters
Black Canadian male actors
Year of birth missing (living people)